Margaret Okayo (born May 30, 1976 in Masaba, Kisii District) is a professional marathon runner from Kenya. She has won a number of major marathons, including the New York City Marathon (two times), the Boston Marathon, and the London Marathon. She has also won the San Diego Marathon on two occasions.

Okayo started running while at primary school. She graduated from the Itierio Secondary School, located near Kisii town, in 1993. She was recruited by Kenya Prisons Service, home to the country's top women's marathon runners, in 1995 where she nurtured her running career.

At the 1998 Commonwealth Games she finished fifth in 10,000 metres. She finished thirteenth at the 1999 IAAF World Half Marathon Championships.

Amongst her most successful races are the wins at the New York Marathon in 2001 and 2003, the Boston Marathon in 2002 and the London Marathon in 2004. She still holds the course records at the New York Marathon and the Boston Marathon.

Other marathons won by Okayo include Milan in 2003, San Diego in 2000 and 2001. She represented her native Kenya in the 2004 Summer Olympic Games in Athens, Greece, but did not finish the marathon. She spends three months of every year training in Italy.

She won the 2003 Udine Half Marathon and finished third at the 2008 Rome-Ostia Half Marathon.

Okayo is of the Gusii tribe. She is managed by Federico Rosa and coached by Gabriele Rosa.

Achievements
All results regarding marathon, unless stated otherwise

References

IAAF: Focus on Athletes

External links
Marathoninfo profile
Rosa & Associati profile

1976 births
Living people
Kenyan female long-distance runners
Kenyan female marathon runners
Athletes (track and field) at the 2004 Summer Olympics
Olympic athletes of Kenya
Athletes (track and field) at the 1998 Commonwealth Games
London Marathon female winners
Boston Marathon female winners
New York City Marathon female winners
Commonwealth Games competitors for Kenya
20th-century Kenyan women
21st-century Kenyan women